Nurbiy Khasambiyevich Khakunov (born 1 November 1954) is a Russian professional football coach. Currently, he is a director with FC Krasnodar.

External links
  Career info at KLISF

1954 births
Living people
Soviet footballers
Russian football managers
FC Krasnodar managers
Association football forwards